Myklebostad (sometimes known as Vistdal) is a village in the Vistdal valley in Molde Municipality in Møre og Romsdal county, Norway. The village was a part of the former municipality of Eresfjord og Vistdal from 1890 until 1964. Vistdal Church is located in Myklebostad.

References

Molde
Villages in Møre og Romsdal